The impenitent thief is a man described in the New Testament account of the Crucifixion of Jesus. In the Gospel narrative, two criminal bandits are crucified alongside Jesus. In the first two Gospels (Matthew and Mark), they both join the crowd in mocking him. In the version of the Gospel of Luke, however, one taunts Jesus about not saving himself and them, and the other (known as the penitent thief) asks for mercy.

In apocryphal writings, the impenitent thief is given the name Gestas, which first appears in the Gospel of Nicodemus, while his companion is called Dismas. Christian tradition holds that Gestas was on the cross to the left of Jesus and Dismas was on the cross to the right of Jesus. In Jacobus de Voragine's Golden Legend, the name of the impenitent thief is given as Gesmas. The impenitent thief is sometimes referred to as the "bad thief" in contrast to the good thief.

The apocryphal Arabic Infancy Gospel refers to Gestas and Dismas as Dumachus and Titus, respectively. According to tradition – seen, for instance, in Henry Wadsworth Longfellow's The Golden Legend – Dumachus was one of a band of robbers who attacked Saint Joseph and the Holy Family on their flight into Egypt.

New Testament narrative

The earliest version of the story is considered to be that in the Gospel of Mark, usually dated to around AD 70. The author says that two bandits were crucified with Jesus, one on each side of him. The passersby and chief priests mock Jesus for claiming to be the Messiah and  yet being unable to save himself, and the two crucified with him join in. Some texts include a reference to the Book of Isaiah, citing this as a fulfilment of prophecy (Isaiah 53:12: "And he … was numbered with the transgressors"). The Gospel of Matthew, written around the year 85, repeats the same details.

In the Gospel of Luke version however, from around 80–90, the details are varied: one of the bandits rebukes the other for mocking Jesus, and asks Jesus to remember him "when you come into your kingdom". Jesus replies by promising him that he will be with him that same day in Paradise. Tradition has given this bandit the name of the penitent thief, and the other the impenitent thief.

The Gospel of John, thought to be written about AD 90–95, also says that Jesus was crucified with two others, but in this account they are not described and they do not speak.

See also 
 List of names for the Biblical nameless

References

External links

Gospel of Luke
People in the canonical gospels
30s deaths
People executed by crucifixion
Year of birth unknown
People executed for theft
People executed by the Roman Empire
Unnamed people of the Bible